The Tai are a Muslim community found in the state of Gujarat in India. There is also a large diaspora in the city of Karachi in Pakistan.

History and origin 

The word tai in Persian means a basket weaver, which was the traditional occupation of the Tai community. According to some traditions, the community originated in Sindh, and their dialect of Kutchi still includes substantial Sindhi loanwords. There ancestral home was the city of Thatta in Sindh, which was the historic capital of medieval Sindh. They were invited by Sultan Ahmad Shah of Gujarat to settle in Ahmadabad, the city he had founded. There are three groups among the Tai, the Vankar distributed in Viramgam, Dhrangadhra and Ahmadabad, the Ahmadabadi Tai and the Mahdevi Tai. The last group are members of the Mehdawi sect, who are followers of Syed Mohamed Jaunpuri, whom they consider to be the Mahdi. The other Tai communities are Sunni Muslims. They use two surnames, Paggi and Kattar.

Present circumstances 

The Tai are landless community, whose traditional occupation is weaving. Many members of the community have diversified, and are now traders.

The Tai are divided by their sectarian affiliation, the Sunni Tai have their own cultural and communal organizations, and the Mehdawi Tai are members of All Gujarat Mahodiya Conference, a sectarian association.

See also 

Momna

References 

Muhajir communities
Muslim communities of Gujarat
Weaving communities of South Asia